The Quezon City Museum Complex, more commonly known as the QCX Museum or the Quezon City Experience Museum is an interactive and socio-cultural green building-compliant city museum which was inaugurated on November 9, 2015, within the Quezon Memorial Circle in Quezon City, Metro Manila, Philippines. QCX primarily displays the history and culture of Quezon City. It is touted as the first interactive museum of the city. The museum concept was conceived in 2006.

Facilities

The museum allows its visitors to have interactions with the display, take selfies on each of the museum's galleries and shoot and watch themselves on videotape. The museum complex composes of five pods, and had plans to add coffee shop and a small cafeteria and memorabilia store at the lobby. The museum hosts a small theater which has a seating capacity of 80-90 people and a 60-seat lecture room, both which is available for rent.

The following five buildings form part of the museum complex:

Gallery A – 
Gallery B – 
Gallery C – 
Administrative Building – 
Business Center –

References

External links

Museums in Quezon City
Museums established in 2015
2015 establishments in the Philippines
History museums in the Philippines
City museums in the Philippines